Trucks is a 1997 Canadian-American television horror film directed by Chris Thomson, which follows the story of a group of tourists and locals attacked by autonomous trucks and other inexplicable phenomena in a rural town. It is based on Stephen King's short story "Trucks", which also served as the source material for the earlier film Maximum Overdrive, the only film directed by King. Trucks aired on the USA Network on October 29, 1997.

Plot
Lunar is a small Nevada town populated mostly by rednecks and kept alive by its military base (in proximity to Area 51), and its urban folklore featuring aliens, which has provided local resident Hope with her hiking and tourism business. Ray, the local gas station owner and a former resident of Detroit, Michigan, lives with his brooding teenage son Logan, and frequents a local diner run by George, a retired Korean War veteran and police officer. One hot summer morning, Phil, an aging man who runs a local auto salvage yard, is feeding his dogs when he is killed in an apparent freak accident after a truck with no driver veers into his home, pushing him through the walls and killing him. Hope notices the truck later parked in the middle of the road on her way to the bus depot, but she thinks nothing of it. A transfer truck carrying frozen meats is casually traveling along a country road, but then the vehicle starts swerving erratically. After the driver notices the truck acting strange, the person exits the vehicle and inspects the trailer. Soon after, the truck locks the driver inside its trailer with no means of escape, starts itself up and drives off. Hope picks up a group of assorted tourists that morning: Jack (an obese, aging hippie who believes in UFOs), Thad (a former Gulf War naval officer divorced from his wife), and Abby (Thad's sullen teenage daughter, who is spending the summer with him and hoping to go to Las Vegas). Hope is forced to pull her vehicle over, carrying the tourists, when they come across Phil's truck still blocking the road. As the group exits Hope's car, the frozen meat truck nearly hits them. While Jack remarks that it looks like there's no driver at the wheel, Thad laughs this concept off as silly. A terrified Hope calls Ray on her cell phone, and Ray hurries to go find her. When he arrives, he and the other tourists find Hope cowering next to the discovery of Phil's nude corpse lying on the ground, severely lacerated; this causes Abby to scream. Ray takes the group in his own car back to Lunar. Meanwhile, tourists Brad (a used car salesman) and June (a failed, aging model who married Brad as a teenager) arrive in Lunar and enter George's diner, unaware that they were nearly hit and killed by a large unmanned truck on their way in. Ray's car is hit and nearly destroyed while being rear-ended by a yellow truck with increasing speed, but the group finally makes it to George's diner. At this point, all of the patrons at the diner are noticing bizarre phenomena: a variety of trucks with no driver are circling the lot between the diner, Hope's cabins and the gas station, weird news reports are coming in, all oddly timed between bouts of static, and the anchorwoman on the screen reveals that a large black cloud (also visible from the diner's windows) is a leak from a chemical factory accident somewhere near the military base. While Jack speculates that the trucks are being affected by energy fields caused by aliens, two rednecks in the diner argue, based on the chemical accident, that the survivors in the diner are all being involuntarily included in a government experiment.

Two HAZMAT workers are called in to investigate the black cloud, but one of the HAZMAT suits in their truck inflates with air, then animates inexplicably to pick up an ax and murder both workers, after which the truck joins the others in Lunar. A postal worker drops off some mail at a toy store when an RC Tonka dump truck drives through a window and chases after the postal worker. The toy gradually kills the person by driving aggressively into him multiple times. 

George reveals that he has a firearm on the diner's premises, but he tells Hope that Ray detests guns due to a drive-by gang shooting in Detroit that killed his wife. As the group is split up between the cabins and the diner, Logan and Abby find themselves becoming friends as they are trapped with Brad and June. Brad attempts to repair a seemingly dead truck in the garage adjacent to the cabins, but the truck animates and drives forward into his stomach, crushing the man up against the door until he is killed. This causes Abby to break down sobbing, while June has a nervous breakdown and is rescued by Ray, who brings her back to the diner. Abby and Logan attempt to cross over from the cabins back to the diner, but become trapped in a drain pipe beneath the lot as a truck attempts to dump silt over them and asphyxiate the teens. As this is happening, the two rednecks beat Thad unconscious (only for one to be knocked out by Jack), while the second redneck runs outside. Despite the distraction, Ray is able to get Logan and Abby safely out of the drainpipe, but he is unable to rescue the redneck, who is relentlessly chased by the trucks and is forced to flee into the nearest building, where he proceeds to get drunk on the cheap beer left in the refrigerator there. He uses the remaining beers to create a bundle of Molotov cocktails, but accidentally kills himself in the process, blowing up one of the buildings. Ray is surprised when the trucks leave him alone, and he realizes that they're sparing him for some unknown reason. This prompts him and Thad to create a plan: Thad will use a motorcycle stored in the garage to sneak up to the base and seek help, while the group will sneak out at night and venture through the forest as Ray distracts the trucks. June wanders up a hillside and his killed by a truck from behind. As night falls over Lunar, Logan rescues the motorcycle and brings it indoors just before one of the trucks destroys the garage. An outdoor payphone rings, and Abby runs outside to answer it, causing Jack to shove her aside as a truck nearly hits her, but Jack himself is crushed to death in the process, traumatizing Abby. As the trucks knock out the diner's water supply and electric generator, Ray discovers that the trucks were sparing him specifically because they believe that as the gas station owner, Ray is the only human who can refuel them. As Ray and Hope refuel the trucks, Thad and Abby sneak away on the motorcycle. Ray, Hope and Logan meet up in the forest, but George doesn't make it, as he sacrifices himself by shooting his firearm at the trucks, causing one to tip over and become stuck while another gets stuck in the diner building after crashing into it. Ray uses a hunting rifle he finds in the body of one of the trucks and shoots at the truck in the diner, causing the entire structure to explode. That morning, the trio of survivors spot the burned-up but still functioning diner truck chasing them, but they climb aboard a helicopter and are saved. There they find Abby, who is shaken severely and too traumatized to speak for some reason. Believing that Thad is piloting the copter, Ray moves forward to thank him, but finds the helicopter unmanned, and worse still, tilting upwards further into the sky as the screen fades to black.

Cast 
 Timothy Busfield as Ray Porter
 Brenda Bakke as Hope Gladstone
 Brendan Fletcher as Logan Porter
 Roman Podhora as Thad Timmy
 Jay Brazeau as Jack
 Amy Stewart as Abby Timmy
 Victor Cowie as George "Georgie"
 Aidan Devine as Trucker Bob
 Sharon Bajer as June Yeager
 Jonathan Barrett as Brad Yeager
 Rick Skene as Trucker Pete
 Don Granberry as Sheriff
 Kirk Harper as Lino
 Harry Nelken as Phil

Trucks used in the film
 Western Star 4964 
 Grumman-Olson Kurbmaster
 Ford F-Series
 Chevrolet Task-Force Apache
 GMC New Design 
 Ford Econoline 
 GMC C6500

Production
Principal photography concluded on August 22, 1997.  Shooting took place in Gunton and Winnipeg, Manitoba.

Reception
Trucks received very little critical attention outside of independent internet blogs. TV Guide rated Trucks 2/4 stars and wrote, "The film is all premise and no plot, a problem made worse by the clumsy addition of extraneous gory sequences." Rob Dean of Daily Grindhouse commended the film's various actors, but gave an unfavourable review overall, stating, "Trucks doesn’t realize that it is a movie couched in real fears but would be better explored through a lot of vehicular action and exaggerated gruesomeness and insanity. It’s far too subdued, and not nearly loony enough. The constant attempt to ground the story in a “logical” explanation - mostly delivered by a TV set that shouldn’t work but does, and only gets the exposition channel - undercuts the fact that this could just be a goofy thing with some menace that people would overanalyze on the Internet 20 years later." Dean compared the film unfavourably to the cult horror film Rubber.

See also
 Maximum Overdrive
 Christine
 Rubber

References

External links
 
 

1997 films
1997 horror films
1997 television films
1997 action thriller films
1990s action horror films
1990s English-language films
1990s psychological thriller films
1990s science fiction horror films
American action horror films
American action thriller films
American horror television films
American science fiction horror films
American science fiction action films
American thriller television films
Apocalyptic films
Canadian action thriller films
Canadian science fiction horror films
Canadian thriller television films
Films based on works by Stephen King
Films directed by Chris Thomson (director)
Films set in Nevada
Films shot in Winnipeg
Television films based on short fiction
Trucker films
USA Network original films
1990s American films
1990s Canadian films